Sport climbing at the 2012 Asian Beach Games was held from 17 June to 20 June 2012 in Fengxiang Beach, Haiyang, China.

Medalists

Men

Women

Medal table

Results

Men

Bouldering
17–19 June

Lead
18–20 June

Speed

Qualification
17 June

Knockout round
18 June

Speed relay

Qualification
17 June

Final round
18 June

Women

Bouldering
17–19 June

Lead
18–20 June

Speed

Qualification
17 June

Knockout round
18 June

Speed relay

Qualification
17 June

Final round
18 June

References

 Results Book

External links
 Official Website

2012 Asian Beach Games events
Sport climbing at the Asian Beach Games
2012 in sport climbing